Sirindhorn station is an elevated railway station on the MRT Blue Line. This station opened on 4 December 2019. The station is located on the southern side of the Bang Phlat intersection near the western terminus of the Krung Thon Bridge.

References

MRT (Bangkok) stations